George S. Fleming was an American actor, director, and scenic designer whose short films were influential early projects in the medium.

Life and career
The Edison Manufacturing Company hired George S. Fleming in January 1901, just as its new roof-top studio on East Twenty-First Street in New York City were opening. Fleming and Edwin S. Porter were frequent collaborators. Fleming left the Edison production team in 1903.

Selected filmography
Life of an American Fireman:  Director, 1903	 	 
The Interrupted Bathers:  Director, 1902	 	 
Jack and the Beanstalk:  Director, Set Designer, 1902	 	 	 
The Burlesque Suicide, No. 2:  Director, 1902	 	 
Execution of Czolgosz with Panorama of Auburn Prison:  Production Assistant (uncredited), 1901	 
Trapeze Disrobing Act:  Director, 1901	 	
President McKinley and Escort Going to the Capitol:
Ice-Boat Racing at Red Bank, N. J.:
Kansas Saloon Smashers (also titled Mrs. Carrie Nation and Her Hatchet Brigade)  Director, 1901	 
What Happened on Twenty-third Street, New York City: Director (uncredited), 1901	 	 
The Old Maid Having Her Picture Taken:  Director, 1901

References

External links

American film directors
American male film actors
Year of death missing
Place of death missing
Year of birth missing
Place of birth missing